The year 1840 in architecture involved some significant architectural events and new buildings.

Events
 27 April – The foundation stone of the new Palace of Westminster in London is laid as its reconstruction to a design by Charles Barry following a fire in 1834 begins (completed in 1860).
 30 September – Foundation of Nelson's Column, designed by William Railton, laid in London, Trafalgar Square being laid out and paved around it during the year.

Buildings and structures

Buildings opened

 11 May – Wingfield railway station in England, designed by Francis Thompson, is opened.
 31 August – Bristol Temple Meads railway station in England, designed by Isambard Kingdom Brunel, is opened.
 July Column, Place de la Bastille, Paris, designed by Jean-Antoine Alavoine and Joseph-Louis Duc, erected, incorporating Auguste Dumont's Génie de la Liberté and bas-reliefs by Antoine-Louis Barye and others.
 Khaplu Palace built.
 Old Patent Office Building, Washington D.C., United States completed by Robert Mills.
 Forglen House, Scotland, designed by John Smith, is completed at about this date.

Awards
 Grand Prix de Rome, architecture:  Théodore Ballu.

Births

 January 11 – Robert Chisholm, English-born architect working in British India; proponent of the Indo-Saracenic style (died 1915)
 J. M. Brydon, Scottish-born architect working in London (died 1901)

Deaths
 February 18 – Sir Jeffry Wyatville, English architect and garden designer (born 1766)
 May 4 – Carl Ludvig Engel, German Empire style architect (born 1778)

References

Architecture
Years in architecture
19th-century architecture